The 134th Indiana Infantry Regiment served in the Union Army between May 25 and September 2, 1864, during the American Civil War.

Service 
The regiment was organized at Indianapolis, Indiana and mustered in on May 25, 1864. It was ordered to Tennessee and Alabama for railroad guard duty, until early September 1864. The regiment was mustered out on September 2, 1864. During its service the regiment lost twenty-eight men to disease.

See also
 List of Indiana Civil War regiments

References

Bibliography 
 Dyer, Frederick H. (1959). A Compendium of the War of the Rebellion. New York and London. Thomas Yoseloff, Publisher. .

Units and formations of the Union Army from Indiana
Military units and formations established in 1864
1864 establishments in Indiana
Military units and formations disestablished in 1864
1864 disestablishments in the United States